Rodrigo García Rena (born February 27, 1980, in Miajadas) is a Spanish cyclist.

Palmarès

2003
1st stages 2 and 4 Volta a Lleida
1st Vuelta a la Montana Central de Asturias
1st stage 2
3rd Cursa Ciclista del Llobregat
3rd Vuelta a Toledo
2004
1st Copa de España
1st Cursa Ciclista del Llobregat
1st Vuelta a Toledo
1st stage 1
1st stage 2a Vuelta a la Montana Central de Asturias
3rd Aiztondo Klasica
2006
2nd Vuelta a Andalucía
2007
1st stages 4 and 5 Vuelta a Asturias

References

1980 births
Living people
Spanish male cyclists
Cyclists from Extremadura
Sportspeople from the Province of Cáceres